South Wales Police Rugby Football Club is a Welsh rugby union team based in Bridgend, South Wales. The club is a member of the Welsh Rugby Union and is a feeder club for the Ospreys.  In 2012, they withdrew from the Welsh league system due to lack of players, they will continue to play in police competitions and may return to the Welsh league in the future.

History 
South Wales Police RFC was established in June 1969 when the rugby teams of four different police forces amalgamated. These police teams represented Cardiff City, Glamorgan, Merthyr Borough and  Swansea Borough. The team's first match was during the 1969/70 season against Pontypridd RFC, a game the police won. In June 1971 the club gained membership to the Welsh Rugby Union forcing the players to choose between their 'civilian' clubs or to switch to the South Wales Police.

The club has since provided many players to the Welsh national team, including Bleddyn Bowen who captained Wales. The club's Senior XV are also one of the more active touring teams and have played in Africa, Europe, America and Asia.

Club honours
 Snelling Sevens 1993 - Champions

Tours 
2007/08 season - Bermuda
 Bermuda 10 -  South Wales Police RFC 31

Notable former players 
  Bleddyn Bowen (23 caps), captained Wales whilst playing for South Wales Police RFC
  Richie Collins (38 caps)
  Richie Donavan (1 cap)
  Alex Finlayson (3 caps)
  Ian Gallagher (1 cap)
  Ian Hall (8 caps)
  Hugh Williams Jones (17 caps)
  Mike Knill (1 cap)
  Martyn Morris (12 caps)
  Stuart Parfitt (3 caps)
  Rowland Phillips (10 caps)
  Steve Sutton (9 caps)
  John Wakeford (2 caps)

References

Rugby clubs established in 1969
Welsh rugby union teams